Australoplana sanguinea is species of flatworm native to Australia. It has been locally introduced to New Zealand. Two subspecies are currently recognized, A. s. alba (Jones, 1981) and A. s. sanguinea Moseley, 1877.

References

Geoplanidae
Rhabditophora genera